Christopher Jonathan Williams (born 2 February 1985) is an English former professional footballer and coach.

The Manchester-born player notably appeared in the Football League for both Stockport County and Grimsby Town, before going on to play non-League football for Leigh RMI, Northwich Victoria, Bradford Park Avenue, Stalybridge Celtic and Fleetwood Town. He also had spells in the Welsh Premier League for both Rhyl and The New Saints.

Playing career

Stockport County
A pacey winger who can play on either flank, Williams started his career in Stockport County's youth system as a 12-year-old. He turned professional in October 2001, and made his first-team debut aged 16 years 256 days, as a late substitute in the 1–1 draw with Watford in Division One, on 10 November the same year. He spent several short spells out on loan, at Grimsby Town in 2004, Leigh RMI in 2005, and Northwich Victoria in 2006, and was released by Stockport in March 2006.

Move into non-League
After his release from County, Williams signed a permanent deal with Northwich, initially until the end of the 2005–06 season, but in August 2006 he suffered a compound fracture of the right leg which kept him on the sidelines until April 2007. Williams failed to make an impact on the first team, fell out with the manager, and in January 2008 he was released, moving on to Bradford Park Avenue where he spent the rest of the 2007–08 season before joining Stalybridge Celtic in the summer. In February 2009, he was transferred to Fleetwood Town.

Rhyl and The New Saints
In September 2009 he moved on to Welsh Premier League club Rhyl where he spent two seasons. On 27 May 2011 he joined The New Saints. His competitive debut for the club took place on 30 June 2011 against Cliftonville in a Europa League first qualifying round match.

In July 2012 he rejoined Rhyl.

Return to England
Williams returned to the English non-League by joining Stockport Sports during the 2013–14 season, before moving to Salford City in March 2014.

Coaching career
Based in Manchester, Williams now owns and coaches for the "Chris Williams Football Academy".

References

External links
 

1985 births
Living people
Footballers from Manchester
English footballers
Association football midfielders
Stockport County F.C. players
Grimsby Town F.C. players
Leigh Genesis F.C. players
Northwich Victoria F.C. players
Bradford (Park Avenue) A.F.C. players
Stalybridge Celtic F.C. players
Fleetwood Town F.C. players
Rhyl F.C. players
The New Saints F.C. players
Stockport Sports F.C. players
Salford City F.C. players
English Football League players
National League (English football) players
Cymru Premier players
Northern Premier League players